Bahria University (BU) is a public-sector university established in 2000 by the Pakistan Navy at Shangrilla Road, Sector E-8/1 in Islamabad, Pakistan. The university maintains campuses in Karachi and Lahore.

Established by the Pakistan Navy in 2000, its status is semi-government. It offers programs in undergraduate, post-graduate, and doctoral studies. Its research is directed towards the development of engineering, philosophy, natural, social, and medical sciences. Bahria is a comprehensive university having multidisciplinary programs that include Health Sciences, Engineering Sciences, Computer Sciences, Management Sciences, Social Sciences, Law, Earth and Environmental Sciences, Psychology and Maritime Studies. The university is one of the top institutions of higher learning in the country and secured 23rd in among the country's top thirty and most notable universities in the "general category" by the HEC, as of 2016. The university is a member of the Association of Commonwealth Universities of the United Kingdom.

The university research institutes offer scientific research in the development of medical, environmental, natural sciences as well as in engineering and philosophy. Bahria University is a founder member of the Education Futures Collaboration charity, an international network of educators working on strategies to bridge the research/practise/policy-making divide.

History

Bahria University has its genesis in Bahria Colleges and Bahria Institutes of Management and Computer Sciences which were established by the Pakistan Navy in the 1980s and 1990s in Islamabad and Karachi. These institutes and colleges were affiliated with Peshawar University to conduct bachelor and master's degree programs in the disciplines of business management and computer sciences.

The university offers bachelor and higher degree programs. It produces professionals in areas like electronics and telecommunication, electrical, computer sciences, software engineering, media studies, business management, earth and environmental sciences, medical and health sciences, professional psychology, social sciences and law.

The growth and policies of the university are governed by its board of governors, comprising senior naval officers and representatives of the Ministry of Finance, the Ministry of Education and the Higher Education Commission of Pakistan. The chief of the naval staff is the chairman of the board of governors as well as pro-chancellor of the university.

Campuses 

The university has campuses in Islamabad, Karachi and Lahore. The headquarters of the university is in Islamabad, consisting of three blocks (OC, NC and XC) including a girls hostel. A new building has been constructed for business students. Furthermore, the headquarters consists of a business incubation center, auditorium, gymnasium, and several cafeterias throughout the campus.

 Bahria University Islamabad Campus (Headquarter)
 Bahria University Karachi Campus
 Bahria University Lahore Campus
 Institute of Professional Psychology, Karachi
 National Center for Maritime Policy Research, Karachi
 Bahria University Medical & Dental College, Karachi

Affiliated colleges 
Bahria University is the awarding body for the following affiliated institutions:

 Shifa College of Medicine, Islamabad
 Shifa College of Nursing, Islamabad
 Frontier Medical College, Abbottabad
 Islamabad Medical and Dental College, Islamabad
 Yusra Medical & Dental College, Islamabad
 Institute of Teachers Education, Rawalpindi
 Rawal Institute of Health Sciences Islamabad
 Bahria University Medical and Dental College, Karachi

International linkages 
Bahria University has signed Memorandum of understanding with the following 21 international universities:

 Valparaiso University, USA
 University of Wollongong, Australia
 Edith Cowan University, Australia
 Dogus University, Turkey
 International College Beijing, China
 Tongji University, China
 University of Leicester, UK
 University of Nottingham, UK
 York St. John University, UK
 University of Bedfordshire, UK
 Greenwich University, UK
 Massachusetts Institute of Technology, USA
 Dalhousie University, Canada
 Chabahar Maritime University, Iran
 Al-Khawarizmi Intl. College, UAE
 Institute of Oriental Studies, Azerbaijan
 King's College – Corbett Center, UK
 Trieste University, Italy
 Xuzhou Normal University
 Yasar University, Turkey
 Damghan University, Iran
 University of Idaho, USA

Degrees offered 
Bahria University offers the following undergraduate and postgraduate degrees at its constituent units: The standard of education is comparable to many European and American universities.

Management Sciences 
 Bachelor of Business Administration
 Bachelor of Maritime Business & Management
 BS (Accounting and Finance)
 BS (Project Management)
 Master of Business Administration
  Master of Business Administration (At Weekend)
 MS Maritime Ports and Shipping Management
 MS Maritime Trade and Logistics
 MBA (Pharmaceutical Business Management)
 Post Graduate Diploma (Pharmaceutical Business Management)
 MPhil (Management Sciences)
 PhD (Management Sciences)
 MS in Project Management (Weekend)
 MS in Supply Chain (Weekend)
 MS in Finance

Electrical Engineering 
 Bachelor of Electrical Engineering
 Bachelor of Electrical Engineering (Telecommunication)
 Masters of Science Electrical Engineering
 PhD Electrical Engineering

Computer Engineering 
 Bachelor of Computer Engineering
 PhD Computer Engineering

Software Engineering 
 Bachelor of Software Engineering
 Masters of Science Software Engineering
 PhD Software Engineering
 Masters of Science Engineering Management

Department of Law 
 LLB (Bachelor of Law)
 LLM (General)
 LLM (International and Maritime Laws)
 PhD (Law)

Computer Sciences 
 Bachelor of Science (Computer Science)
 Master of Science (Computer Science)
 Bachelor of Science (Information Technology)
 Master of Science (Telecom & Networking)
 PhD Computer Sciences

Earth and Environmental Sciences 
 Bachelor of Science (Geology)
 Bachelor of Science (Geophysics)
 Bachelor of Science (Environmental Sciences)
 Master of Science (Geology)
 Master of Science (Geophysics)
 Master of Science (Environmental Sciences)
 Master of Science (Environmental Policy and Management)

Professional Psychology 
 Bachelor of Science Psychology
 PMD Psychology
 MPhil Psychology
 MS Clinical Psychology
 PhD Psychology

Humanities and Social Sciences 
 Bachelor of International Relations
 Bachelor of Social Sciences
 Bachelor of Media Studies
 Bachelor of Economics

Medical and Dental Sciences 
 Bachelor of Medicine and Bachelor of Surgery
 Bachelor of Dental Surgery (BDS)

Sports 
The university helps its students to participate in national and university level sports. The Bahria University Islamabad Campus has a large gymnasium to facilitate sporting events such as basketball matches. There is also a separate fitness gym for males and females to train at their own times. These gyms include treadmills, weight lifting machines, etc... to facilitate the students.

Societies
Bahria University has student-driven societies, clubs and associations that work under the tutelage of the student affairs office. Societies and clubs at BU include:
 Bahria Association of Computer Sciences and Professionals (BACSAP)
 Bahria University Law Society (BULS)
 Bahria University Law Moot Society (BULMS)
 Bahria Youth Technothon (BYTE)
 Bahria Community Support Program (CSP)
 Media Club (Saad Tehsin)
 Arts & Dramatics Club
 The Music Society
 The Events Club
 The Literature & Debates Club
 IEEE BUIC
 Society Of Empowerment (SOE) BUKC 
 Bahria Visionary Club (BVC)

Notable alumni
 Hasan Raheem, singer-songwriter
 Umair Jaswal, singer
 Yashma Gill, actor
 Rafay Baloch, IT hacker and security researcher
 Masuma Anwar, Doctor by profession and a singer
 Sana Mahmud, Athlete.

Rectors
 Shahid Iqbal, (2012-2015)
 Tanveer Faiz, (2015-2018)
 Kaleem Shaukat, (2019–Present)

See also 
 Higher Education Commission of Pakistan
 Pakistan Engineering Council
 Pakistan Medical Commission
 National Business Education Accreditation Council
 National Computing Education Accreditation Council
 Pakistan Bar Council

References

External links

 Bahria University – Headquarters

Bahria University
Educational institutions established in 2000
2000 establishments in Pakistan
Pakistan Navy
Islamabad Capital Territory